Angular distance  (also known as angular separation, apparent distance, or apparent separation) is the angle between the two sightlines, or between two point objects as viewed from an observer.

Angular distance appears in mathematics (in particular geometry and trigonometry) and all natural sciences (e.g. astronomy and geophysics). In the classical mechanics of rotating objects, it appears alongside angular velocity, angular acceleration, angular momentum, moment of inertia and torque.

Use
The term angular distance (or separation) is technically synonymous with angle itself, but is meant to suggest the linear distance between objects (for instance, a couple of stars observed from Earth).

Measurement
Since the angular distance (or separation) is conceptually identical to an angle, it is measured in the same units, such as degrees or radians, using instruments such as goniometers or optical instruments specially designed to point in well-defined directions and record the corresponding angles (such as telescopes).

Equation

General case 

To derive the equation that describes the angular separation of two points located on the surface of a sphere as seen from the center of the sphere, we use the example of two astronomical objects  and  observed from the Earth. Let  indicate the observer on Earth, assumed to be located at the center of the celestial sphere.
 
which is equivalent to:

In the  frame, the two unitary vectors are decomposed into:

Therefore, 

then:

Small angular distance approximation 
The above expression is valid for any position of A and B on the sphere. In astronomy, it often happens that the considered objects are really close in the sky: stars in a telescope field of view, binary stars, the satellites of the giant planets of the solar system, etc. In the small-angle approximation, at second order, the above expression becomes:

meaning

hence
.

Small angular distance: planar approximation 

If we consider a detector imaging a small sky field (dimension much less than one radian) with the -axis pointing up, parallel to the meridian of right ascension , and the -axis along the parallel of declination , the angular separation can be written as:
 

See also
 Milliradian
 Gradian
 Hour angle
 Central angle
 Angle of rotation
 Angular diameter
 Angular displacement
 Great-circle distance

References

 CASTOR, author(s) unknown. "The Spherical Trigonometry vs. Vector Analysis".

Angle
Astrometry
Trigonometry